Scincella capitanea, the large ground skink, is a species of skink endemic to Nepal.

References

Scincella
Reptiles of Nepal
Endemic fauna of Nepal
Reptiles described in 1986
Taxa named by Paul E. Ouboter